Cobblestone House is a historic home located at Bath in Steuben County, New York.  It is a cobblestone building built in the Greek Revival style in 1851.

It was listed on the National Register of Historic Places in 1983.

References

Houses on the National Register of Historic Places in New York (state)
Houses completed in 1851
Cobblestone architecture
Houses in Steuben County, New York
1851 establishments in New York (state)
National Register of Historic Places in Steuben County, New York